Mount Wyman is a mountain, 2,665 m, at the end of the rock spur running west from Sandford Cliffs, Queen Elizabeth Range. Named by Advisory Committee on Antarctic Names (US-ACAN) for Carl O. Wyman, ionospheric scientist at Little America V, 1957.

Mountains of Oates Land